Atelopus epikeisthos is a species of toads in the family Bufonidae. It is endemic to Peru.

References

epikeisthos
Amphibians of Peru
Amphibians described in 2005